Barnwell East is a 2.6 hectare Local Nature Reserve in Cambridge. It is owned and managed by Cambridge City Council.

The site has woodland, a pond, scrub and grassland. Flora include blackthorns, hawthorns and bee orchids, there are birds such as blackcaps and willow warblers, and common blue and meadow brown butterflies.

There is an entrance at the junction of Uphall Road  and Nuttings Road.

References

Local Nature Reserves in Cambridgeshire